UNESCO Asia Pacific Heritage Awards (since 2000) are given with as the strategic purpose of UNESCO with in the region Asia Pacific. The objective is to motivate the protection of Cultural Heritage sites, which are initiated by any individual organization under private sector or institutional organization.

Award categories

The Awards consist of five categories.
 Award of Excellence. 
 Award of Distinction. 
 Award of Merit.
 Honourable Mention.
 Award for New Design in Heritage Contexts

Laureates

2022 
Award of Excellence: Chhatrapati Shivaji Maharaj Vastu Sangrahalaya Museum, Mumbai, India 

Award of Distinction 

Stepwells of Golconda, Hyderabad, India

Zarch Qanat, Yazd, Iran 

Neilson Hays Library, Bangkok, Thailand 

Award of Merit

Topdara Stupa, Charikar, Afghanistan 

Nantian Buddhist Temple, Fujian, China 

Domakonda Fort, Telangana, India 

Byculla Station, Mumbai, India 

Sadoughi House, Yazd, Iran 

25 Chivas in Kathmandu, Nepal 

Special Recognition for Sustainable Development

West Guizhou Lilong Neighborhood, Shanghai, China 

Award for New Design in Heritage Contexts

M30 Integrated Infrastructure for Power Supply and Waste Collection, Macao SAR, China

Xiaoxihu Block, Nanjing, China

2019
 Award of Excellence: Tai Kwun – Centre for Heritage and Arts of Hong Kong SAR
 Award of Distinction:
 Keyuan Garden, Suzhou, China
 Vikram Sarabhai Library, Indian Institute of Management, Ahmedabad, India
 Nelson School of Music, Nelson, New Zealand
 Award of Merit:
 Tseto Goenpa, Paro, Bhutan
 Guyue Bridge, Chi’an Town, Zhejiang, China
 Keneseth Eliyahoo Synagogue, Mumbai, India
 Our Lady of Glory Church, Mumbai, India
 Lyttelton Timeball Station, Christchurch, New Zealand
 Honourable Mention:
 The 5s Classroom, Preshil The Margaret Lyttle Memorial School, Kew, Australia
 Westpac Long Gallery, Australian Museum, Sydney, Australia
 Liddell Bros. Packing Plant, Wuhan, China
 Flora Fountain, Mumbai, India
 New Design in Heritage Contexts:
 Joan Sutherland Theatre Passageway and Lift, Sydney Opera House, Sydney, Australia
 Dry Pit Latrine in Jiaxian Ancient Jujube Garden, Nihegou Village, Shaanxi, China
 The Mills, Hong Kong SAR, China

2018
 Award of Excellence: Renewal of the early 20th-century Shijo-cho Ofune-hoko Float Machiya
 Award of Distinction:
 The LAMO Centre, Ladakh, India
 Award of Merit:
 5 Martin Place, Sydney, Australia
 Aijing Zhuang, Fujian, China
 Old Warehouse of the Commercial Bank of Honjo, Saitama, Japan
 Honourable Mention:
 Hengdaohezi Town, Heilongjiang, China
 Rajabai Clock Tower & University of Mumbai Library Building, Mumbai, India
 Ruttonsee Muljee Jetha Fountain, Mumbai, India
 New Design in Heritage Contexts:
 Kaomai Estate 1955, Chiang Mai, Thailand
 The Harts Mill, Port Adelaide, Australia

2017
 Award of Excellence: Blue House Cluster, Hong Kong SAR
 Award of Distinction:
 Brookman and Moir Streets Precinct, Perth, Australia
 Holy Trinity Cathedral, Shanghai, China
 Award of Merit:
 Christ Church, Mumbai, India
 Royal Bombay Opera House, Mumbai, India
 Sri Ranganathaswamy Temple, Srirangam, India
 Great Hall and Clock Tower Buildings, Arts Centre, Christchurch, New Zealand
 Honourable Mention:
 Bomonjee Hormarjee Wadia Fountain and Clock Tower, Mumbai, India
 Gateways of Gohad Fort, Gohad, India
 Haveli Dharampura, Delhi, India
 Wellington Fountain, Mumbai, India
 Aftab Cultural House, Isfahan, Iran
 Cathedral of the Good Shepherd and Rectory Building, Singapore
 New Design in Heritage Contexts:
 Jingdezhen Ceramic Industry Museum, Jingdezhen, China
 Macha Village, Gansu Province, China
 Persian Gulf University – Faculty of Art & Architecture, Bushehr, Iran

2016
 Award of Excellence: Sanro-Den Hall, Sukunahikona Shrine in Ōzu, Ehime
 Award of Distinction: 
 Conservation and Restoration of Taoping Qiang Village, Sichuan Province, China
 Conservation of St. Olav's Church, Serampore
 Award of Merit:
Repairs and Restoration to the Cama Building, Mumbai Central, Mumbai, India
Restoration of Fortification of Walls & Bastions of Mahidpur Fort, Madhya Pradesh, India
Conservation of the 17th Century Shahi Hammam, Lahore, Pakistan
 Honourable Mention:
Renovation Project of Wu Changshuo Residence Archaeological Site, Zhejiang Province, China
Fudewan Miners Village of Wenzhou Alunite Mine in China, Zhejiang Province, China
The World Bank loan Cultural and Natural Heritage Protection and Development Project, Liu Ancestral Hall Preservation and Renovation Project of Sanmentang Village, Tianzhu County, Guizhou province, China
Revitalisation of the Old Tai Po Police Station into a Green Hub for Sustainable Living, Hong Kong
Restoration of the Main Building Doon School, Dehradun, Uttarakhand, India
Darugheh House, Mashad, Khorasan Razavi, Iran.
 New Design in Heritage Contexts:
 The Brewery Yard, Central Park, Chippendale, Australia

2015
 Award of Excellence: Vadakkunnathan Temple, Kerala, India

References

External links

 UNESCO Asia Pacific Heritage Awards

UNESCO awards
Awards established in 2000